The term gonadal artery is a generic term for a paired artery, with one arising from the abdominal aorta for each gonad. Specifically, it can refer to:
 the testicular artery in males
 the ovarian artery in females

Arteries of the abdomen